Christian Andersen may refer to:

 Christian Andersen (cyclist) (born 1967), Danish cyclist
 Christian Andersen (footballer) (born 1944),  Danish football player and manager
 Christian Andersen (sport shooter) (1896–1982), Danish sports shooter
 Klumben (Christian Andersen, born 1987), Danish musician

See also
 Hans Christian Andersen (1805–1875) Danish author
 Cristian Anderson Penilla Caicedo (born 1991), Ecuadorian football midfielder